The Miss Perú 1980 pageant was held on June 20, 1980. That year, 16 candidates were competing for the national crown. The chosen winners represented Peru at the Miss Universe 1980 and Miss World 1980. The rest of the finalists would enter in different pageants.

Placements

Special Awards

 Best Regional Costume - Lambayeque - Paulina Muro
 Best Hair - Amazonas - Jeanette Vergara
 Miss Photogenic - San Martín - Ana Ramírez Rengifo
 Miss Body - Cuzco - Roxana Vega
 Miss Elegance - Region Lima - Diana Quijano

.

Delegates

Amazonas - Jeanette Vergara
Arequipa - Rosella Concha Fernández
Apurímac - Sandra Calisto
Cuzco - Roxana Vega
Distrito Capital - Alicia Tillit
Europe Perú - Nancy Brescia Scavia
Huánuco - Lisseth Ramis
La Libertad - Patricia Benavides

Lambayeque - Paulina Muro
Loreto - Patricia Pedraz
Piura -  Cristina Boza Pardo
Region Lima - Diana Quijano
San Martín - Anita Ramírez Rengifo
Tacna - Mónica Moreno Guerra
Ucayali - Milena Aguirre Roca 
USA Peru - Carla Barila

References 

Miss Peru
1980 in Peru
1980 beauty pageants